The robust velvet gecko or robust gecko (Nebulifera robusta) is a species of gecko endemic to Australia.

References

Geckos of Australia
Diplodactylidae
Reptiles described in 1885
Taxa named by George Albert Boulenger